The BC Bike Race is a seven-day mountain bike stage race held in British Columbia, Canada,  traditionally held in early July. Six hundred racers ride an average of 50 kilometres a day on race routes that are 75% singletrack.

Route

Each year, the BC Bike Race route changes, but has always included Vancouver Island, the Sunshine Coast, and the Sea to Sky Corridor. The 2010 version of the race involved a Prologue on Vancouver's North Shore, then days in Nanaimo, Cumberland, Powell River, Earls Cove to Sechelt, Sechelt to Langdale, Squamish, and Whistler. The race format evolved with years, in particular the Vancouver's North Shore stage was not included in 2013 race.

Between 2010 and 2012 the event offered the racers two formats: Epic and Challenge. The Epic (run since 2007) is seven days of racing with the average course length of 60 km each day. The Challenge (run since 2010 until 2012) is also seven days, but sports an average of 30 km each day. Both options took place at the same time and incorporate the same Base Camps each day.

The route for 2019 will once again include a prologue in North Vancouver. Racers then will experience Cowichan Valley, Cumberland (for two stages), Powell River, Sechelt (for two stages), and the final stage in Squamish.

Categories

In 2007 and 2008, racers had to compete as part of a team.  Now, BC Bike Race offers a Solo option; Solo categories are Open Men, Men 40+, Men 50+ Open Women, Women 40+, and Women 50+. Teams of two categories include: Open Men, Open Women, Open Mixed, Veterans 80+ (combined age of both riders is over eighty), and Veterans 100+ (combined age over one hundred).

Guest racers
The race has been known to extend invitations to certain riders to compete as a celebrity guest on certain stages. Past guests include Trevor Linden (Ex-Captain of the Vancouver Canucks).

Results

Solo racers

Team racers
2008 Results
400 starters

2007 Results
210 starters

See also
 Absa Cape Epic
 La Ruta de los Conquistadores
 Trans Alp Challenge
 Transrockies

References

External links

 The BC Bike Race Home Page

Mountain biking events in Canada
Cycle races in Canada
Recurring sporting events established in 2007
2007 establishments in British Columbia
Mountain biking in British Columbia